Waldemar Bloch (1906–1984) was an Austrian composer.

He wrote several operas, including Stella, Das Käthchen von Heilbronn and Der Diener zweier Herren, as well as choral and instrumental works. His 1968 oratorio Passio Domini was particularly well received.

List of works
"Sonate (1956) for Violin and Guitar. Duo46 "FM1: Homage to the 50s. Guitar Plus Records, 1998.

Austrian male composers
Austrian composers
Musicians from Vienna
1906 births
1984 deaths
20th-century Austrian composers
20th-century Austrian male musicians